A music sequencer (or audio sequencer or simply sequencer) is a device or application software that can record, edit, or play back music, by handling note and performance information in several forms, typically CV/Gate, MIDI, or Open Sound Control (OSC), and possibly audio and automation data for digital audio workstations (DAWs) and plug-ins.

Overview

Modern sequencers 

The advent of Musical Instrument Digital Interface (MIDI) and the Atari ST home computer in the 1980s gave programmers the opportunity to design software that could more easily record and play back sequences of notes played or programmed by a musician. This software also improved on the quality of the earlier sequencers which tended to be mechanical sounding and were only able to play back notes of exactly equal duration. Software-based sequencers allowed musicians to program performances that were more expressive and more human. These new sequencers could also be used to control external synthesizers, especially rackmounted sound modules, and it was no longer necessary for each synthesizer to have its own devoted keyboard.

As the technology matured, sequencers gained more features, such as the ability to record multitrack audio. Sequencers used for audio recording are called digital audio workstations (DAWs).

Many modern sequencers can be used to control virtual instruments implemented as software plug-ins. This allows musicians to replace expensive and cumbersome standalone synthesizers with their software equivalents.

Today the term "sequencer" is often used to describe software. However, hardware sequencers still exist. Workstation keyboards have their own proprietary built-in MIDI sequencers. Drum machines and some older synthesizers have their own step sequencer built in.  There are still also standalone hardware MIDI sequencers, although the market demand for those has diminished greatly due to the greater feature set of their software counterparts.

Types of music sequencer 

Music sequencers can be categorized by handling data types, such as:
 MIDI data for MIDI sequencers (implemented as hardware or software)
 CV/Gate data for analog sequencers and possibly others  (via CV/Gate interfaces)
 Automation data for mixing-automation in DAWs, and software effect / instrument plug-ins for DAWs with sequencing features
 Audio data in audio sequencers including DAWs, loop-based music software, etc.; or phrase samplers including Groove machines, etc.

Also, music sequencer can be categorized by its construction and supporting modes.

Analog sequencer 

Analog sequencers are typically implemented with analog electronics, and play the musical notes designated by a series of knobs or sliders corresponding to each musical note (step). It is designed for both composition and live performance; users can change the musical notes at any time without regarding recording mode.  And also possibly, the time interval between each musical note (length of each step) can be independently adjustable.  Typically, analog sequencers are used to generate the repeated minimalistic phrases which may be reminiscent of Tangerine Dream, Giorgio Moroder or trance music.

Step sequencer (step recording mode) 

On step sequencers, musical notes are rounded into steps of equal time intervals, and users can enter each musical note without exact timing;  instead, the timing and duration of each step can be designated in several different ways:
 On the drum machines: select a trigger timing from a row of step-buttons.
 On the bass machines: select a step note (or rest) from a chromatic keypads, then select a step duration (or tie) from a group of length-buttons, sequentially.
 On the several home keyboards:in addition to the realtime sequencer, a pair of step trigger button is provided; using it, notes on the pre-recorded sequence can be triggered in arbitrary timings for the timing dedicated recordings or performances. (See List of music sequencers#Step sequencers (supported on).)

In general, step mode, along with roughly quantized semi-realtime mode, is often supported on the  drum machines, bass machines and several groove machines.

Realtime sequencer (realtime recording mode) 

Realtime sequencers record the musical notes in real-time as on audio recorders, and play back musical notes with designated tempo, quantizations, and pitch.  For editing, usually "punch in/punch out" features originated in the tape recording are provided, although it requires sufficient skills to obtain the desired result. For detailed editing, possibly another visual editing mode under graphical user interface may be more suitable.  Anyway, this mode provides usability similar to audio recorders already familiar to musicians, and it is widely supported on software sequencers, DAWs, and built-in hardware sequencers.

Software sequencer 

Software sequencer is a class of application software providing a functionality of music sequencer, and often provided as one feature of the DAW or the integrated music authoring environments.  The features provided as sequencers vary widely depending on the software; even an analog sequencer can be simulated.  The user may control the software sequencer either by using the graphical user interfaces or a specialized input devices, such as a MIDI controller.

Typical features on software sequencers

Audio sequencer 
Alternative subsets of audio sequencers include:

History

Early sequencers

The early music sequencers were sound-producing devices such as automatic musical instruments, music boxes, mechanical organs, player pianos, and Orchestrions. Player pianos, for example, had much in common with contemporary sequencers. Composers or arrangers transmitted music to piano rolls which were subsequently edited by technicians who prepared the rolls for mass duplication. Eventually consumers were able to purchase these rolls and play them back on their own player pianos.

The origin of automatic musical instruments seems remarkably old.  As early as the 9th century, the Persian (Iranian) Banū Mūsā brothers invented a hydropowered organ using exchangeable cylinders with pins, and also an automatic flute playing machine using steam power, as described in their Book of Ingenious Devices. The Banu Musa brothers' automatic flute player was the first programmable music sequencer device, and the first example of repetitive music technology, powered by hydraulics.

In 1206, Al-Jazari, an Arab engineer, invented programmable musical automata, a "robot band" which performed "more than fifty facial and body actions during each musical selection." It was notably the first programmable drum machine. Among the four automaton musicians were two drummers. It was a drum machine where pegs (cams) bump into little levers that operated the percussion. The drummers could be made to play different rhythms and different drum patterns if the pegs were moved around.

In the 14th century, rotating cylinders with pins were used to play a carillon (steam organ) in Flanders, and at least in the 15th century, barrel organs were seen in the Netherlands.

In the late-18th or early-19th century, with technological advances of the Industrial Revolution various automatic musical instruments were invented. Some examples: music boxes, barrel organs and barrel pianos consisting of a barrel or cylinder with pins or a flat metal disc with punched holes; or mechanical organs, player pianos and orchestrions using book music / music rolls (piano rolls) with punched holes, etc.  These instruments were disseminated widely as popular entertainment devices prior to the inventions of phonographs, radios, and sound films which eventually eclipsed all such home music production devices.
Of them all, punched-paper-tape media had been used until the mid-20th century. The earliest programmable music synthesizers including the RCA Mark II Sound Synthesizer in 1957, and the Siemens Synthesizer in 1959, were also controlled via punch tapes similar to piano rolls.

Additional inventions grew out of sound film audio technology. The drawn sound technique which appeared in the late 1920s, is notable as a precursor of today's intuitive graphical user interfaces. In this technique, notes and various sound parameters are triggered by hand-drawn black ink waveforms directly upon the film substrate, hence they resemble piano rolls (or the 'strip charts' of the modern sequencers/DAWs). Drawn soundtrack was often used in early experimental electronic music, including the Variophone developed by Yevgeny Sholpo in 1930, and the Oramics designed by Daphne Oram in 1957, and so forth.

Analog sequencers

During the 1940s–1960s, Raymond Scott, an American composer of electronic music, invented various kind of music sequencers for his electric compositions.  The "Wall of Sound", once covered on the wall of his studio in New York during the 1940s–1950s, was an electro-mechanical sequencer to produce rhythmic patterns, consisting of stepping relays (used on dial pulse telephone exchange), solenoids, control switches, and tone circuits with 16 individual oscillators.  Later, Robert Moog would explain it in such terms as "the whole room would go 'clack - clack - clack', and the sounds would come out all over the place".
The Circle Machine, developed in 1959, had incandescent bulbs each with its own rheostat, arranged in a ring, and a rotating arm with photocell scanning over the ring, to generate an arbitrary waveform. Also, the rotating speed of the arm was controlled via the brightness of lights, and as a result, arbitrary rhythms were generated.
The first electronic sequencer was invented by Raymond Scott, using thyratrons and relays.

Clavivox, developed since 1952, was a kind of keyboard synthesizer with sequencer.  On its prototype, a theremin manufactured by young Robert Moog was utilized to enable portamento over 3-octave range, and on later version, it was replaced by a pair of photographic film and photocell for controlling the pitch by voltage.

In 1968 Ralph Lundsten and Leo Nilsson had a polyphonic synthesizer with sequencer called Andromatic built for them by Erkki Kurenniemi.

Step sequencers

The step sequencers played rigid patterns of notes using a grid of (usually) 16 buttons, or steps, each step being 1/16 of a measure. These patterns of notes were then chained together to form longer compositions.  Sequencers of this kind are still in use, mostly built into drum machines and grooveboxes. They are monophonic by nature, although some are multi-timbral, meaning that they can control several different sounds but only play one note on each of those sounds.

Early computers

On the other hand, software sequencers were continuously utilized since the 1950s in the context of computer music, including computer-played music (software sequencer), computer-composed music (music synthesis), and computer sound generation (sound synthesis). In June 1951, the first computer music Colonel Bogey was played on CSIRAC, Australia's first digital computer. In 1956, Lejaren Hiller at the University of Illinois at Urbana–Champaign wrote one of the earliest programs for computer music composition on ILLIAC, and collaborated on the first piece, Illiac Suite for String Quartet, with Leonard Issaction. In 1957 Max Mathews at Bell Labs wrote MUSIC, the first widely used program for sound generation, and a 17-second composition was performed by the IBM 704 computer. Subsequently, computer music  was mainly researched on the expensive mainframe computers in computer centers, until the 1970s when minicomputers and then microcomputers became available in this field.

In Japan, experiments in computer music date back to 1962, when Keio University professor Sekine and Toshiba engineer Hayashi experimented with the TOSBAC computer. This resulted in a piece entitled TOSBAC Suite.

Early computer music hardware
 In 1965, Mathews and L. Rosler developed Graphic 1, an interactive graphical sound system  (that implies sequencer) on which one could draw figures using a light-pen that would be converted into sound, simplifying the process of composing computer-generated music. It used PDP-5 minicomputer for data input, and IBM 7094 mainframe computer for rendering sound. 

Also in 1970, Mathews and F. R. Moore developed the GROOVE (Generated Real-time Output Operations on Voltage-controlled Equipment) system, a first fully developed music synthesis system for interactive composition (that implies sequencer) and realtime performance, using 3C/Honeywell DDP-24 (or DDP-224) minicomputers. It used a CRT display to simplify the management of music synthesis in realtime, 12bit D/A for realtime sound playback, an interface for analog devices, and even several controllers including a musical keyboard, knobs, and rotating joysticks to capture realtime performance.

Digital sequencers
In 1971, Electronic Music Studios (EMS) released one of the first digital sequencer products as a module of Synthi 100, and its derivation, Synthi Sequencer series.
After then, Oberheim released the DS-2 Digital Sequencer in 1974, and Sequential Circuits released Model 800 in 1977 

In 1977, Roland Corporation released the MC-8 Microcomposer, also called computer music composer by Roland. It was an early stand-alone, microprocessor-based, digital CV/Gate sequencer, and an early polyphonic sequencer. It equipped a keypad to enter notes as numeric codes, 16 KB of RAM for a maximum of 5200 notes (large for the time), and a polyphony function which allocated multiple pitch CVs to a single Gate. It was capable of eight-channel polyphony, allowing the creation of polyrhythmic sequences. The MC-8 had a significant impact on popular electronic music, with the MC-8 and its descendants (such as the Roland MC-4 Microcomposer) impacting popular electronic music production in the 1970s and 1980s more than any other family of sequencers. The MC-8's earliest known users were Yellow Magic Orchestra in 1978.

Music workstations 

In 1975, New England Digital (NED) released ABLE computer (microcomputer) as a dedicated data processing unit for Dartmouth Digital Synthesizer (1973), and based on it, later Synclavier series were developed.

The Synclavier I, released in September 1977,  was one of the earliest digital music workstation product with multitrack sequencer.  Synclavier series evolved throughout the late-1970s to the mid-1980s, and they also established integration of digital-audio and music-sequencer, on their Direct-to-Disk option in 1984, and later Tapeless Studio system.

In 1982, renewed the Fairlight CMI Series II and added new sequencer software "Page R", which combined step sequencing with sample playback.

Yamaha's GS-1, their first FM digital synthesizer, was released in 1980. To program the synthesizer, Yamaha built a custom computer workstation . It was only available at Yamaha's headquarters in Japan (Hamamatsu) and the United States (Buena Park).

While there were earlier microprocessor-based sequencers for digital polyphonic synthesizers, their early products tended to prefer the newer internal digital buses than the old-style analogue CV/Gate interface once used on their prototype system. Then in the early-1980s, they also re-recognized the needs of CV/Gate interface, and supported it along with MIDI as options.

MIDI sequencers 

In June 1981, Roland Corporation founder Ikutaro Kakehashi proposed the concept of standardization between different manufacturers' instruments as well as computers, to Oberheim Electronics founder Tom Oberheim and Sequential Circuits president Dave Smith. In October 1981, Kakehashi, Oberheim and Smith discussed the concept with representatives from Yamaha, Korg and Kawai. In 1983, the MIDI standard was unveiled by Kakehashi and Smith. The first MIDI sequencer was the Roland MSQ-700, released in 1983.

It was not until the advent of MIDI that general-purpose computers started to play a role as sequencers. Following the widespread adoption of MIDI, computer-based MIDI sequencers were developed. MIDI-to-CV/Gate converters were then used to enable analogue synthesizers to be controlled by a MIDI sequencer. Since its introduction, MIDI has remained the musical instrument industry standard interface through to the present day.

Personal computers 

In 1987, software sequencers called trackers were developed to realize the low-cost integration of sampling sound and interactive digital sequencer as seen on Fairlight CMI II "Page R". They became popular in the 1980s and 1990s as simple sequencers for creating computer game music, and remain popular in the demoscene and chiptune music.

Modern computer digital audio software after the 2000s, such as Ableton Live, incorporates aspects of sequencers among many other features.

In Japan 
In 1978, Japanese personal computers such as the Hitachi Basic Master equipped the low-bit D/A converter to generate sound which can be sequenced using Music Macro Language (MML). This was used to produce chiptune video game music.

It was not until the advent of MIDI, introduced to the public in 1983, that general-purpose computers really started to play a role as software sequencers. NEC's personal computers, the PC-88 and PC-98, added support for MIDI sequencing with MML programming in 1982. In 1983, Yamaha modules for the MSX featured music production capabilities, real-time FM synthesis with sequencing, MIDI sequencing, and a graphical user interface for the software sequencer. Also in 1983, Roland Corporation's CMU-800 sound module introduced music synthesis and sequencing to the PC, Apple II, and Commodore 64.

The spread of MIDI on personal computers was facilitated by Roland's MPU-401, released in 1984. It was the first MIDI-equipped PC sound card, capable of MIDI sound processing and sequencing. After Roland sold MPU sound chips to other sound card manufacturers, it established a universal standard MIDI-to-PC interface. Following the widespread adoption of MIDI, computer-based MIDI software sequencers were developed.

Visual timeline of rhythm sequencers

See also
 List of music sequencers – related article split from this article
 List of music software
 Tracker (music software)
 Music workstation
 Groovebox
 Combination action#Sequencers (for organs)

Notes

References

Further reading
List of papers sharing a similar perspective with this Wikipedia article:
 Note: although this conference paper emphasized the "Ace Tone FR-1 Rhythm Ace", it is not the music sequencer nor the first drum machine product.

External links 

 
 
  (1974 newspaper article about digital sequencer)
 
 
 

 
Electronic musical instruments
MIDI
Music software
Sound production technology
Synthesiser modules
Articles containing video clips
Iranian inventions